Chirkov (from чирок (chirok) meaning "teal") is a Don Cossack Russian masculine surname; its feminine counterpart is Chirkova.
The exact origin of the family traces to the river Chir, a tributary of the Don river, and its age and its position are documented. 
Ennobled as princes, the Chirkov family is featured in Leo Tolstoy's Anna Karenina, where a member of Karenin's family is mentioned as having married Princess Chirkova. 
Following the revolution, the family was dispersed, but its members have held influential posts in post-Soviet and Russian society, including the current admiral of the Russian fleet.

The name may refer to
 Boris Chirkov (1901–1982), Soviet actor
 Svetlana Chirkova-Lozovaya (born 1945), Soviet fencer
 Viktor Chirkov (born 1959), Russian admiral
 Denista Chirkova (1909–1977), Bulgarian Folk Dancer, Burlesque Artist

Russian-language surnames
Bulgarian-language surnames